Chaffey may refer to:

People
 Chaffey (surname)

Education
 Chaffey College in California
 Chaffey High School in California
 Chaffey Joint Union High School District in California
 Chaffey Adult School in California

Places

Australia
Chaffey, South Australia, a locality in the District Council of Renmark Paringa
 Electoral district of Chaffey in South Australia
 Chaffey Dam, a dam on the Peel River, New South Wales

United States
 Chaffey, Wisconsin, an unincorporated community